The 1949 SANFL Grand Final was an Australian rules football competition.   beat  95 to 72.

Teams

References 

SANFL Grand Finals
SANFL Grand Final, 1949